Naureen is a given name. Notable people with the name include:

 Naureen Farouq Ibrahim, Pakistani politician
 Naureen Zaim (born 1978), American model, actress, artist, and boxer

See also
 Maureen
 Noreen (given name)